Stenobothrus stigmaticus is a species belonging to the family Acrididae subfamily Gomphocerinae and is sometimes called the lesser mottled grasshopper.

Distribution
The species inhabits most of Europe, from southern Spain to Scandinavia, in the east it reaches the Baltic Sea coast (southeast Lithuania). In the southeast, it reaches European Russia via the Balkan Peninsula and Northern Greece. In Italy, in the south part of the Alps, Stenobothrus stigmaticus is replaced by her extremely similar sister species Stenobothrus apenninus.  In the British Isles S. stigmaticus was originally only found on the Isle of Man, but records now exist for north Wales and the Wash (see range map).

References

stigmaticus
Orthoptera of Europe
Insects described in 1838